The women's long jump event at the 1977 Summer Universiade was held at the Vasil Levski National Stadium in Sofia on 22 and 23 August.

Medalists

Results

Qualification

Final

References

Athletics at the 1977 Summer Universiade
1977